Whittle Glacier is a short channel glacier flowing northeast to Colvocoresses Bay and terminating in a small glacier tongue  northwest of Williamson Glacier. Delineated from air photos taken by U.S. Navy Operation Highjump (1946–47), and named by Advisory Committee on Antarctic Names (US-ACAN) for Dr. J.S. Whittle, Assistant Surgeon on the sloop Vincennes of the United States Exploring Expedition (1838–42) under Lieutenant Charles Wilkes.

Whittle Glacier Tongue is a small glacier tongue extending seaward from Whittle Glacier into Colvocoresses Bay. Delineated from aerial photographs taken by U.S. Navy Operation Highjump (1946–47), and named by Advisory Committee on Antarctic Names (US-ACAN) in association with Whittle Glacier.

See also
 List of glaciers in the Antarctic
 Glaciology

References

Glaciers of Wilkes Land